Apomecynoides linavourii is a species of beetle in the family Cerambycidae. It was described by Téocchi in 2011.

References

Apomecynini
Beetles described in 2011